James Thomas Abbott is an American attorney and government official who was a member of the Federal Labor Relations Authority (FLRA) from 2017 to 2022. Before his service with the FLRA, Abbott served as Deputy General Counsel for the United States Congress Office of Compliance from 2004 to 2007. Earlier in his career, he was the Senior Associate District Counsel for Personnel and Ethics at the Defense Contract Management Agency; Chief Counsel at Corpus Christi Army Depot, United States Army Materiel Command; and Senior Labor Counsel at the HQ Depot Systems Command, U.S. Army Materiel Command.

References

Living people
Malone University alumni
Temple University Beasley School of Law alumni
21st-century American lawyers
Trump administration personnel
LGBT appointed officials in the United States
Ohio Republicans
Year of birth missing (living people)